Ramnagar, also spelled as Ramnagar Mahuware, is a town in Ambedkar Nagar district, Faizabad division, in the state of Uttar Pradesh, India. It is located on National Highway 233A between Tanda and Rajesultanpur.
It is also near Hanswar.

Educations 
Pt. Ram Lakhan Shukla Rajkeey Post Graduate College Alapur 

Mansoorganj
 Ramnagar, Alapur
 Sekhauliya
 Chaudharipur
 Nagdaha

See also
Ambedkar Nagar district Top Kasba/Market 
 Hanswar
 Tanda
 Akbarpur
 Rajesultanpur
 Jalalpur
 Baskhari

References

Villages in Ambedkar Nagar district